Stříbrná is a municipality and village in Sokolov District in the Karlovy Vary Region of the Czech Republic. It has about 400 inhabitants.

History
The first written mention of Stříbrná is from 1601.

References

Villages in Sokolov District